Night Work is a 1939 American comedy film starring Mary Boland, Charles Ruggles, Billy Lee, and Donald O'Connor. It was the sequel of Boy Trouble.

Cast
 Mary Boland as Sybil Fitch
 Charles Ruggles as Homer C. Fitch
 Billy Lee as Joe Fitch
 Donald O'Connor as Butch Smiley
 Clem Bevans as Smokestack Smiley
 William Frawley as Bruiser Brown
 Joyce Mathews as Patricia Fitch
 John Hartley as Windy Wilson
 William Haade as Mr. Turk
 Edward Gargan as Officer Flannigan

References

External links

1939 comedy films
1939 films
American comedy films
Films directed by George Archainbaud
Paramount Pictures films
American black-and-white films
1930s English-language films
1930s American films